Charles Gordon Rufus Lightfoot (born 25 February 1976) is an English lawyer and former first-class cricketer.

Lightfoot was born at Amersham in February 1976. He was educated at Eton College, before going up to Keble College, Oxford. While studying at Oxford, he played first-class cricket for Oxford University, making his debut against Northamptonshire at Oxford in 1996. He played first-class for Oxford until 1998, making sixteen appearances. He scored a total of 402 runs at an average of 16.75, with a high score of 61. With his slow left-arm orthodox bowling, he took 4 wickets wth best figures of 2 for 65. He is a partner at the London office of Jenner & Block where he is an advocate in the English High Court.

Charles Lightfoot is married to CeCe Sammy

References

External links

1976 births
Living people
People from Amersham
People educated at Eton College
Alumni of Keble College, Oxford
English cricketers
Oxford University cricketers
English lawyers
English barristers